The Minister of Health and Social Affairs or Social minister (Swedish: Socialminister) is the chief of the Ministry of Health and Social Affairs in the government of Sweden. 

All Ministers for Health and Social Affairs have been Head of the Ministry, except in 2014–2017 when the Minister for Social Security, Annika Strandhäll, was appointed to be the head of the ministry, as the office of Minister for Health and Social Affairs was temporarily abolished in the Löfven I Cabinet. In 2017, Strandhäll got promoted to the office of Minister for Health and Social Affairs.

List of Head of the Ministry of Health and Social Affairs 

|}

Government ministers of Sweden
Swedish Ministers for Health
Swedish Ministers for Social Affairs
1920 establishments in Sweden